Jan Stolker (1 July 1724 – 10 June 1785) was a Dutch printmaker, painter, painting dealer, and art collector.

Stolker was born in Amsterdam and became a pupil of Jan Maurits Quinkhard. He is known for portraits and copies of 17th-century artists. He was a member of the Confrerie Pictura and the Rotterdam Guild of Saint Luke.

Stolker died in Rotterdam.

References

Jan Stolker on artnet

1724 births
1785 deaths
Painters from Amsterdam
18th-century Dutch painters
18th-century Dutch male artists
Dutch male painters
Painters from Rotterdam
Painters from The Hague